Centre d'Esports l'Hospitalet is a Spanish football team based in L'Hospitalet de Llobregat, in the autonomous community of Catalonia. Founded in 1957 it currently plays in Tercera División RFEF - Group 5, holding home games at Estadi Municipal de Futbol de L'Hospitalet, with a capacity of 6,740 seats.

History
Centre D'Esports L'Hospitalet was founded in 1957, through of merger of the three teams from the city: UD Hospitalet, CD Santa Eulalia and CF Hércules.

It managed to appear three times in Segunda División, but this was prior to the creation of Segunda División B as the new third level, a category the club first reached in 1982 and where it would remain for the vast majority of the following two decades.

Season to season

3 seasons in Segunda División
31 seasons in Segunda División B
30 seasons in Tercera División
1 season in Tercera División RFEF

Current squad

Technical staff

Honours
Segunda División B: 2012–13
Tercera División: 1959–60, 1981–82, 2004–05, 2009–10, 2019–20

Notable players

Notable coaches
 Dagoberto Moll

Coaches
 Zvonko Monsider (1958–1959)
 Enric Rabassa (1963–1964)
 Dagoberto Moll (1964–1965)
 Julián Arcas Sánchez (1965–1966)
 Gabriel Taltavull Monjo (1966)
 Roberto Puerto Castells (1982–1983)
 Esperanza (1983–1985)
 Josep Mauri Carbonell (1986)
 Raúl Longhi (1986–1987)
 Juan José Díaz Galiana (1987–1990)
 Antoni Gras  (1990)
 Rafael González Anguita (1990)
 Jaime Sabaté Mercadé (1990–1992)
 Alfonso Martínez Salinas (1992)
 Marc Serrano Villuendas (1992)
 Ramón Moya (1993–1994)
 Josep María Nogués (1994–1996)
 Ramón Moya(1996–1999)
 Miquel Corominas Queralt (1999–2000)
 Lluís Pujol (2000–2001)
 García Escribano (2001–2002)
Jaume Creixell Barnada (2002–2003)
 Roberto Elvira (2004–2005)
 Ramón Moya (2005–2006)
 Juan Carlos Oliva (2006–2007)
 Jordi Roura (2007)
  Andrés García Tébar (2008)
 Julià Garcia (2008–2009)
 Jordi Vinyals (2009–2010)
 Ángel Pedraza (2010)
 Miguel Álvarez (2010–2011)
 Jordi Vinyals (2011–2012)
 Miguel Álvarez (2012–2013)
 Martín Posse (2013)
 Kiko Ramírez (2013–2015)
 Martí Cifuentes (2015–2016)
 Miquel Corominas (2016)
 Ismael García Gómez (2016–2017)
 Xavier Molist (2017–2019)
 Jonathan Risueño (2019– )

References

External links

Official website 
Futbolme team profile 
Official blog 

 
Sport in L'Hospitalet de Llobregat
Football clubs in Catalonia
Association football clubs established in 1957
1957 establishments in Spain
Segunda División clubs